West Point Team Handball  is a handball club from West Point, New York, United States. They are the handball team of the United States Military Academy. They play with four teams at various competitions. There are two teams for each gender. The West Point Black team (men and women) is the first team and the West Point Gold team (men and women) is the second team. They have won the most College National Championships in their collegiate league.

Accomplishments
Nationals:
Men's Elite:
 : 2014
 : 2008
Men's Open / Division I:
 : 1998
 : 2006
 : 2014
Men's Division II:
 : 2017
College Nationals:
Men: 
 : 1976, 1979–1982, 1985–1987, 1989–1993, 1995–2001, 2003, 2007–2019, 2022
 : 2002–2006, 2010–2013, 2015–2016
Women:
 : 1980, 1990–1991, 1996, 1999–2003, 2005–2007, 2012–2017, 2019, 2022
 : 2009–2011, 2022
 : 2000, 2002, 2006 2010, 2015–2017
Northeast Team Handball League
Men's Division I:
 : 2012/2013, 2013/14, 2015/16, 2016/17
 : 2009/2010, 2011/12, 2014/15
Women's Division:
 : 2014/2015
Carolina Blue Cup (men) : 5
 : 1991, 1992, 1998, 2009, 2010
 : 1993, 1997, 2004, 2008, 2016
 : 1994, 2000, 2007, 2011

Head coaches

Source:

Captains

Source:

Rankings

2017–18

Non of the women's team received votes for the women's poll.

2018–19

* No Ranking was released.

Current Roster

References

External links
 (men)

Handball clubs established in 1975
1975 establishments in New York (state)
Army Black Knights team handball